The Bollingen Tower is a structure built by Swiss psychiatrist Carl Jung. In appearance, it is a small castle with four towers.

History
Jung bought the land in 1922 after the death of his mother. In 1923 he built a two-storey round tower on this land. It was a stone structure suitable to be lived in.  Additions to this tower were constructed in 1927, 1931, and 1935, resulting in a building that has four connected parts.

A second storey was added to the 1927 addition after the death of Jung's wife in 1955, signifying  "an extension of consciousness achieved in old age."

For much of his life Jung spent several months each year living at Bollingen. The Tower is now owned by a family trust and is not open to the public.

The Bollingen Foundation, created in 1945 but inactive since 1968, was named after it.

Inscribed cube

In 1950, on the occasion of his 75th birthday, Jung set up a stone cube on the lakeshore, just west of the tower, inscribing it on three sides.
One side contains a quote taken from the Rosarium philosophorum:

  
A dedication is also inscribed on this side of the stone:    
 (In memory of his 75th birthday, C.G. Jung out of gratitude made and set it up in the year 1950.)

The second side of the cube depicts a Telesphorus figure, a homunculus bearing a lantern and wearing a hooded cape. It is surrounded by a Greek inscription:

The inscription says:

"Time is a child at play, gambling; a child's is the kingship" is a fragment attributed to Heraclitus.

"He points the way to the gates of the sun and to the land of dreams" is a quote from the Odyssey (Book 24, Verse 12). It refers to Hermes the psychopomp, who leads away the spirits of the slain suitors.

The second side also contains a four-part mandala of alchemical significance. The top quarter of the mandala is dedicated to Saturn, the bottom quarter to Mars, the left quarter to Sol-Jupiter [male], and the right quarter to Luna-Venus [female].

The third side of the cube is the side that faces the lake. It bears a Latin inscription of sayings which, Jung says, "are more or less quotations from alchemy."

The inscription reads:

Gallery

See also
Bollingen Foundation
Bollingen Prize
C.G. Jung House Museum

References

Bibliography
Dunne, Claire. Carl Jung: Wounded Healer of the Soul: An Illustrated Biography. Continuum International Publishing Group (2002), pp. 70f., 106-108, 139, 192. Google books
Hart, Vaughan. 'Carl Jung's Alchemical Tower at Bollingen', Res: Anthropology and Aesthetics, 25, 1994, 36-50

External links

BBC.co.uk
Ruedigersuenner.de Der Turm am See (in German)

Carl Jung
Houses in Switzerland